The Sixteen Kingdoms, less commonly the Sixteen States, was a chaotic period in Chinese history from AD 304 to 439 when northern China fragmented into a series of short-lived dynastic states. The majority of these states were founded by the "Five Barbarians", non-Han peoples who had settled in northern and western China during the preceding centuries, and had launched a series of rebellions and invasions against the Western Jin dynasty in the early 4th century. However, several of the states were founded by the Han people, and all of the states—whether ruled by Xiongnu, Xianbei, Di, Jie, Qiang, Han, or others—took on Han-style dynastic names. The states frequently fought against both one another and the Eastern Jin dynasty, which succeeded the Western Jin in 317 and ruled southern China. The period ended with the unification of northern China in 439 by the Northern Wei, a dynasty established by the Xianbei Tuoba clan. This occurred 19 years after the Eastern Jin collapsed in 420, and was replaced by the Liu Song dynasty. Following the unification of the north by Northern Wei, the Northern and Southern dynasties era of Chinese history began.

The term "Sixteen Kingdoms" was first used by the 6th-century historian Cui Hong in the Spring and Autumn Annals of the Sixteen Kingdoms and refers to the five Liangs (Former, Later, Northern, Southern and Western), four Yans (Former, Later, Northern, and Southern), three Qins (Former, Later and Western), two Zhaos (Former and Later), Cheng Han and Xia. Cui Hong did not count several other kingdoms that appeared at the time including the Ran Wei, Zhai Wei, Chouchi, Duan Qi, Qiao Shu, Huan Chu, Tuyuhun and Western Yan. Nor did he include the Northern Wei and its predecessor Dai, because the Northern Wei is considered to be the first of the Northern Dynasties in the period that followed the Sixteen Kingdoms.

Classical Chinese historians called the period the "Sixteen Kingdoms of the Five Barbarians" because of the active roles played by non-Han ethnicities during this period. Even among the states founded by ethnic Han (Former Liang, Western Liang, Ran Wei and Northern Yan), several founders had close relations with ethnic minorities. For example, the father of Ran Min, who founded Ran Wei, was adopted by a Later Zhao ruling family. Feng Ba, who is considered by some historians to be the founder of the Northern Yan, was an ethnic Han who had prominent Xianbei friends, as well as a Xianbei nickname. Gao Yun, considered by other historians to be the Northern Yan founder, was a member of the Goguryeo royal family who had been adopted by Xianbei nobility.

Due to fierce competition among the states and internal political instability, the kingdoms of this era were mostly short-lived. For seven years from 376 to 383, the Former Qin briefly unified northern China, but this ended when the Eastern Jin inflicted a crippling defeat on it at the Battle of Fei River, after which the Former Qin splintered and northern China experienced even greater political fragmentation. The fall of the Western Jin dynasty amidst the rise of non-Han regimes in northern China during the Sixteen Kingdoms period resembles the fall of the Western Roman Empire amidst invasions by the Huns and Germanic tribes in Europe, which also occurred in the 4th to 5th centuries.

History

Background

From the late Eastern Han dynasty to the early Western Jin dynasty, large numbers of non-Han peoples living along China's northern periphery settled in northern China. Some of these migrants such as the Xiongnu and Xianbei had been pastoralist nomads from the northern steppes. Others such as the Di and Qiang were farmers and herders from the mountains of western Sichuan of southwest China. As migrants, they lived among ethnic Han and were sinified to varying degrees. Many worked as farm laborers. Some attained official positions in the court and military. They also faced discrimination and retained clan and tribal affiliations.

The Han dynasty's defeat of the Xiongnu confederation in the Han–Xiongnu War by Han General Dou Xian led to the Han dynasty deporting the Southern Xiongnu along with their Chanyu into northern China. In 167 AD, Duan Jiong conducted an anti-Qiang campaign and massacred Qiang populations as well as settled them outside the frontier in northern China. Cao Cao had a policy of settling Xiongnu nomads away from the frontier near Taiyuan in modern Shanxi province, where they would be less likely to rebel. The Xiongnu abandoned nomadism and the elite were educated in Chinese-Confucian literate culture, but they retained their distinct identity and resented the discrimination they received.

The War of the Eight Princes (291–306) during the reign of the second Jin ruler Emperor Hui severely divided and weakened imperial authority. Hundreds of thousands were killed and millions were uprooted by the internecine fighting. Popular rebellions against heavy taxation and repression erupted throughout the country. The numerous tribal groups in the north and northwest who had been heavily drafted into the military then exploited the chaos to seize power. In Sichuan region, Li Xiong, a Di chieftain, led a successful rebellion and founded Cheng Han kingdom in 304. Thus began the creation of independent kingdoms in China as Jin authority crumbled. Most of these kingdoms were founded by non-Chinese tribal leaders who took on Chinese reign names.

Diplomatic status
During the Sixteen Kingdoms,  the Eastern Jin dynasty to the south continued to insist on its status as supreme overlord and refused to treat any of the kingdoms as equals. For instance, when the Later Zhao sent a diplomatic mission to the south to establish equal relations, the Eastern Jin burnt the embassy's gifts and expelled the envoy. Some of the Sixteen Kingdoms such as Former Yan and Former Liang also agreed to nominally recognise the Eastern Jin as their suzerain.

Fall of the Western Jin to the Former Zhao

Jin princes and military governors often recruited non-Chinese tribes into their armies in their suppression of rebellions and wars with each other. Also in 304, Liu Yuan, a Xiongnu chieftain, who had been fighting in the Jin civil war on the side of Prince Sima Ying, returned home to Shanxi where he reorganized the five tribes of the Xiongnu and declared independence as the successor to the Han Dynasty. His regime, later renamed Zhao, is designated by historians as the Han Zhao or Former Zhao.

After Liu Yuan died in 310, his son Liu Cong killed older brother Liu He and claimed the throne. Liu Cong captured the Jin capital Luoyang and Emperor Hui in 311. In 316, Liu Cong's uncle Liu Yao seized Chang'an (modern day Xi'an) and Emperor Min, ending the Western Jin Dynasty. Sima Rui, a Jin prince who had moved to the South, continued the dynasty as the Eastern Jin from Jiankang (modern day Nanjing). The collapse of Jin authority in the North led other leaders to declare independence. In 313, Zhang Gui, the ethnic Chinese governor of Liangzhou founded the Former Liang in modern-day Gansu. In 315, Tuoba Yilu, a Xianbei chieftain, founded the Dai in modern-day Inner Mongolia.

Shi Le and the Later Zhao
After Liu Cong's death, the kingdom was split between Liu Yao and General Shi Le.  Shi Le was an ethnic Jie who had worked as an indentured farm laborer before joining Liu Yuan's rebellion and becoming a powerful general in Hebei.  In 319, he founded a rival Zhao Kingdom, known as the Later Zhao and in 328 conquered Liu Yao's Former Zhao. Shi Le instituted a dual-system of government that imposed separate rules for Chinese and non-Chinese, and managed to control much of northern China. After his death, his sons were locked in a fratricidal succession struggle and the kingdom was ended in 350 by General Ran Min, an ethnic Chinese who seized the throne and founded the Ran Wei. Ran Min favored Han Chinese and massacred thousands of Jie. He was defeated and killed in 352 by the Murong Xianbei from Liaodong.

In 337, Murong Huang founded the Former Yan in Liaodong, which by 356 had expanded into much of Hebei, Henan and Shandong. For a time, the Former Yan vied for supremacy in northern China with the Former Qin.

Former Qin and the brief unification of northern China

The Former Qin was founded in 351 by Fu Jian (317–355), a Di general, who had served under the Later Zhao and surrendered to the Jin before declaring independence in Shaanxi. After his death in 355, the kingdom was briefly handed to his son Fu Sheng, before his nephew Fu Jian (337–385) took control of the leadership. Under the younger Fu Jian, who was guided by Wang Meng, an ethnic Chinese advisor, the Former Qin strengthened rapidly.  From 370 to 76, the Former Qin extinguished the Former Yan, Dai and Former Liang to unite all of northern China. Fu Jian also captured Sichuan from the Eastern Jin and wanted to conquer the rest of southern China. Wang Meng opposed this move, citing the need for the Former Qin to consolidate control over various ethnicities in northern China, while Qiang chieftain Yao Chang and Xianbei general Murong Chui both supported the idea. In 383, after Wang Meng's death, Fu Jian launched a massive invasion of southern China, but was he was routed in a devastating defeat at the Battle of Feishui, in which Eastern Jin troops vanquished a much larger Former Qin force.

Fragmentation after the Battle of Feishui

After the Battle of Feishui, the power of the Former Qin quickly unraveled as various regimes in the North broke loose. In 384, Murong Chui founded the Later Yan in Hebei. Other Murong royals founded the Western Yan in Shanxi. Yao Chang founded the Later Qin in eastern Gansu. Fu Jian was killed by Yao Chang, but the Former Qin survived by relocating from Shaanxi to Gansu and then Qinghai. In 385, Qifu Guoren, a Xianbei former vassal under Fu Jian, founded the Western Qin. In 386, Lü Guang, a Di general of the Former Qin, founded the Later Liang in western Gansu. Tuoba Gui revived the Dai as the Northern Wei. In 388, Zhai Liao, an ethnic Dingling leader in Henan founded the Zhai Wei, which was wedged between the Later Yan, Western Yan and Eastern Jin. As many as seven kingdoms coexisted for nine years.

The Later Qin, which ended the Former Qin in 394, the Western Qin in 400, and Later Liang in 403, extended its control over much of Shaanxi, Gansu, and Ningxia. But in 407, Helian Bobo, a Xiongnu chieftain, rebelled and founded the Xia in northern Shaanxi, and the Western Qin was revived in the southern Shaanxi. In 416, the Eastern Jin under General Liu Yu launched a northern expedition that captured Luoyang and Chang'an and extinguished the Later Qin. The Eastern Jin could not hold these cities as Liu Yu returned south to seize the Jin throne. The Xia kingdom quickly seized Chang'an.

Later Liang breaks down into Northern, Southern and Western Liang
In the Hexi Corridor of western Gansu, the Later Liang splintered into the Northern Liang and Southern Liang in 397. The Southern Liang was founded by Tufa Wugu, a Xianbei, in Ledu, Qinghai.  The Northern Liang was founded by an ethnic Chinese, Duan Ye in Zhangye, Gansu with the support of Juqu Mengxun, a Xiongnu, who then seized control of the kingdom in 401. In 405, Li Gao, the Chinese commander at Dunhuang broke away from the Northern Liang and founded the short-lived Western Liang. The Western Liang was reabsorbed by the Northern Liang in 421. Li Gao's descendants would go on to found the Tang Dynasty in the 7th century. The Southern Liang was conquered by the Western Qin in 414, and the Northern Liang lasted until 439, when it surrendered to the Northern Wei.

Later Yan breaks down into Northern and Southern Yan
The Later Yan conquered the Zhai Wei in 392 and the Western Yan in 394, but lost a series of engagements to the Northern Wei. In 397, the Northern Wei captured Hebei and splitting the Later Yan into two. Murong Bao moved the Later Yan capital north to Liaoning but Murong De refused to move north and founded the Southern Yan in Henan and Shandong. The Southern Yan was extinguished by the Eastern Jin in 410. The Later Yan lasted until 407 when General Feng Ba, killed Emperor Murong Xi and installed Gao Yun. Gao Yun, a descendant of Goguryeo royalty who was adopted into the Murong court, is considered either the last emperor of the Later Yan or the founding emperor of the Northern Yan. In 409, he was killed by Feng Ba, a Han Chinese assimilated to Xianbei culture, who took control of the Northern Yan.

Eastern Jin efforts to retake the North

During its century-long rule of southern China, the Eastern Jin Dynasty, though beset by local rebellions and insurrections, made several attempts to recapture the North, and managed to make some inroads, but were ultimately unsuccessful. In 313, Sima Rui, the Yuan Emperor gave Zu Ti 1,000 men and 3,000 bolts of cloth for a northern expedition. Despite meager resources, Zu Ti managed to recapture a large swath of Henan south of the Yellow River and repeatedly defeated Shi Le's Later Zhao forces. Eastern Jin Emperors were wary of generals acquiring power and prestige from successful northern expeditions and threatening the throne. The Yuan Emperor did not entrust Zu Ti with the command of much larger expeditionary force in 321.  A disappointed Zu Ti died of illness. The expeditionary force was called back to Jiankang to quell an insurrection, and Shi Le retook Henan.

In 347, Jin general Huan Wen invaded Sichuan and ended the Cheng Han kingdom. He then launched successive expeditions against northern kingdoms, briefly retaking Chang'an from the Former Qin in 354 and Luoyang from Qiang chieftain Yao Xiang in 356. In 369, he led a large force across the Yellow River into Hebei but was defeated by the Former Yan. In 383, the Eastern Jin reclaimed Henan south of the Yellow River after turning back the Former Qin in the Battle of Feishui in 383, but lost that territory once the northern kingdoms strengthened.

Huan Wen had pretensions to seize power and deposed Emperor Fei in favor of Emperor Jianwen in 371. His son Huan Xuan briefly took the throne from Emperor An in a palace coup in 403, but was defeated by general Liu Yu.

Liu Yu also used northern expeditions to build up his power. In 409–10, he led Jin forces in the Battle of Linqu, defeating and destroying the Southern Yan in Shandong. In 416, he took advantage of the death of the Later Qin ruler, invaded Henan and captured Luoyang, and then turned toward Shaanxi and seized Chang'an. The last Later Qin ruler Yao Hong surrendered and was sent to Jiankang and executed.  With the Later Qin destroyed, several smaller states in the northwest, Western Qin, Northern Liang and Western Liang, nominally submitted to Eastern Jin authority. But Liu Yu retreated back to Jiankang to plan his takeover of the Jin throne, and Chang'an was taken by the Xia forces. In 420, Liu Yu forced the Emperor Gong to abdicate and declared himself emperor of the Liu Song Dynasty. In 423, he planned to launch an expedition against the Northern Wei, but died of illness. The Liu Song dynasty ruled southern China until 479.

Northern Wei and the reunification of northern China
The ancestral home of the Tuoba Xianbei was the Greater Khingan range of Inner Mongolia. In 258, the clan migrated south to the Yin Mountains and spread into the Ordos Loop region. In 315, chief Tuoba Yilu was recognized as the Prince of Dai by the Jin Emperor. In 338, Tuoba Shiyijian formally declared Dai's independence and built the capital at Shengle (modern day Horinger County, Hohhot). In 376, the Former Qin attacked Shengle and drove the Tuoba into the northern steppes; Tuoba Shiyijian was killed by his son.

In 386, Tuoba Shiyijian's grandson Tuoba Gui revived the kingdom, which he renamed Wei; it is known to historians as the Northern Wei. From near Hohhot, Tuoba Gui expanded southward, capturing Shanxi and Hebei from the Former Yan and Henan from the Liu Song dynasty. In 398, he moved the capital to Pingcheng (modern day Datong) and declared himself the Emperor Daowu. In 423, Tuoba Gui's grandson Tuoba Tao took the throne as Emperor Taiwu and began the quest to unify the North. Under his leadership, the Northern Wei subdued the Rouran nomads to the north and began the conquest of Shaanxi, Ningxia, and Gansu. In 427, he captured the Xia capital, Tongwancheng in modern-day Jingbian County, Shaanxi.

The Xia under Helian Ding moved to Pingliang, Gansu and conquered the Western Qin at Jincheng (modern day Lanzhou) in 431. Helian Ding sought an alliance with the Liu Song dynasty but was driven further west by the Northern Wei.  Helian Ding wanted to invade the Northern Liang but was captured in a raid by the Tuyuhun nomads and executed by the Northern Wei. In 436, the Tuoba Tao, as Emperor Taiwu, led an expedition against the Northern Yan. Feng Hong, the younger brother of Feng Ba, fled to Goguryeo, where he was killed. The last ruler of the Northern Liang, Juqu Mujian, surrendered in 439, completing the Northern Wei's unification of northern China and marking the end of the Sixteen Kingdoms period. The Tuobas were eventually Sinicized, changing their name to Yuan, and held northern China through the 550s.

Chinese history then entered the Northern and Southern Dynasties period as parallel series of dynasties in the North and South co-existed until the Sui Dynasty united the country in 589.

Maps

Chronology

Involvement of other ethnicities 

The Goguryeo kingdom was a powerful and influential state in northern Korea and parts of northeastern China at the beginning of the Sixteen Kingdoms period. Goguryeo was attacked by the Murong Xianbei numerous times, and in 342 Prince Murong Huang of Former Yan captured the Goguryeo capital Hwando (Wandu in Chinese). Under the powerful and dynamic leadership of feudal kings, Goguryeo during the reign of Gwanggaeto the Great successfully invaded the kingdoms of Baekje, Silla, and Dongbuyeo. Riding its success, Goguryeo campaigned against the Later Yan, obtaining the Liao River region. King Murong Xi of Later Yan twice launched retaliatory attacks to reclaim the Liao River watershed territory, but was only partially successful. At Northern Yan's destruction by the Northern Wei, Yan king Feng Hong fled to Goguryeo to seek asylum. Although granted asylum, Hong was said to have acted as if he was still king, issuing orders and demanding respect, and was executed by King Jangsu of Goguryeo.

The Yuwen Xianbei group Kumo Xi, who lived north of Youzhou, and the Khitan began increasing in strength. In 414, the Kumo Xi tribes sent a trade caravan to Northern Yan, then joined with the Khitan in declaring allegiance to Northern Yan, and then to Northern Wei after its destruction of Northern Yan. Thus, the Northern Wei (essentially the Tuoba Xianbei), held de facto rule over the entire Mongolian Plateau and the Liao River region.

In the Western Regions (modern Xinjiang) of the former Han Empire lay the kingdoms of Shanshan, Qiuzi, Yutian, Dongshi, and Shule. These kingdoms were often controlled or influenced by the various Liang kingdoms that existed during the Sixteen Kingdoms period. The Former Liang organized Gaochang Commandery and Tiandi County in the west, both under the administration of the Gaochang Governor. Day-to-day administration was run out of several forts: Western Regions Chief Clerk, Wu and Ji Colonel, and Jade Gate Commissioner of the Army. Other Liangzhou states generally followed this administrative system. In 382, the Former Qin ruler Fu Jian sent General Lü Guang on a military expedition to the Dayuan kingdom and promoted him to Protector General of the western border regions. After Qin collapsed and Lü Guang founded the Northern Liang, the western border forts and the Shanshan kingdom all became parts of or vassals to the Northern Liang.

Religion 

Several rulers of the northern kingdoms patronized Buddhism which spread across northern China during the Sixteen Kingdoms and flourished during the subsequent Northern Dynasties.

The Former Qin ruler Fu Jian was a strong patron of Buddhist scholarship. After capturing Xiangyang in 379, he invited the monk Dao An to Chang'an to catalogue Buddhist scriptures. When the teachings of the famed Kuchean monk, Kumārajīva, reached Chang'an, Dao An advised Fu Jian to invite the Kumārajīva. In 382, Fu Jian sent general Lü Guang to conquer the Western Regions (Tarim Basin) and bring Kumārajīva to Chang'an. Lü Guang captured Kucha and seized Kumārajīva, but the Former Qin kingdom collapsed after the Battle of Feishui in 383. Lü Guang founded the Later Liang and held Kumārajīva captive in western Gansu for 18 years. In 401, the Later Qin ruler, Yao Xing conquered the Former Liang and Kumārajīva was able to settle in Chang'an and become one of the most influential translators of Buddhist sutras into Chinese.

The earliest grottoes in the Mogao Caves of Dunhuang were carved in the Former Qin. Work on the Maijishan Grottoes began during the Later Qin. The Bingling Grottoes were started during the Western Qin. Numerous other grottoes were built in the Hexi Corridor under the Northern Liang.

See also 

 Battle of Fei River
 Ethnic groups in Chinese history
 Family trees of the rulers of the Sixteen Kingdoms
 Five Barbarians
 Invasion and rebellion of the Five Barbarians
 Sinicization

References

Citations

Sources 

 Spring and Autumn Annals of the Sixteen Kingdoms
 Li Bo; Zheng Yin (2001). "5000 years of Chinese history", Inner Mongolian People's Publishing Corp., .

 
4th century in China
5th century in China
Jin dynasty (266–420)
Dynasties in Chinese history
Former countries in Chinese history
Former kingdoms